Veeragase/Guggla is a dance form prevalent in the state of Karnataka, India. It is a vigorous dance based on Hindu mythology and involves very intense energy-sapping dance movements performed by Jangama. Veeragase is one of the dances demonstrated in the Dasara procession held in Mysore. This dance is performed during festivals and mainly in the Hindu months of Shravana and Karthika. It is performed at all important functions of veerashaivaLingayat household the veeragase artist's are called as puravanta in village side.

Veerashaivism and Veeragaase/Guggla
The basic tenets of Guggla are drawn from Veeragama (One of the 28 key Shaiva Agamas) and usually Veeragaase performers during their acts will convey some stories from the main six Shaiva puranas like Shiva/Linga/Skanda/Agni/Matsya/Kurma - Puranas, and some Kannada Veerashaiva puranas like Girija Kalyana/Prabhulingaleele/Basava purana/Chennabasaveshwara charite...etc. Most popularly conveyed story is of Daksha-yajna.

The custom of bringing Devagange (Gange taruvud - ಗಂಗೆ ತರುವುದು/Devaru taruvudu - ದೇವರು ತರುವುದು) into homes from nearby water-sources (usually from wells) is a tradition in veerashaivaLingayat household for every important functions held (like Marriage, House-warming, Naming, Lingadhaarana <Lingayat-Baptism>...etc.), some Vokkaligas in Karnataka also perform this custom - in this custom Veerabhadra is taken to please mother Ganga, Veeragaase is performed while bringing her home - in Veeraagama Ganga is considered to be the mother of Veerabhadra as he was sprouted out of Shiva's hairs and Ganga has taken residence on  Shiva's head.

Daksha Yajna

Veeragase gets its name from the Hindu legendary warrior lord - Veerabhadra; Ajaata putra (Non biological child - who didn't take birth formally) of lord Shiva. According to Puranas, the Hindu supreme deity Lord Shrimanmahaa Shankara bhagavaan (Shiva) was married to Sati(who is also known as Daakshayini - since she was the favouritest child of Daksha - He got maata Aadishakti incarnated as his child after doing long penance to her). Daksha(the prajapati - one of the eight manasputras of Brahma and a stauch Vaishnavite - Vishnu happens to be his<Daksha's> grandfather in vasthu roopa) was against this marriage because Shiva had beheaded Brahma(Daksha's father) and being Moola-purusha Shiva actually didn't follow any rules(As he was nirguNi) designed by Daksha which made him not to belong to any of the class-categories classified by Daksha(being a Prajaapati, it was his duty to classify everybody from Lord Vishnu - to smallest organism)) and hence bore enmity with Lord Shiva; He married his favouritest daughter Sati to Lord Shiva after multiple insistence from his aaraadhya(celebrated) Lord Vishnu and his father Brahma. Added to this enmity Lord Shiva after marriage, did not do proper conventional(Conventions designed by Daksha in his Shaastras) reverence which is to be done by a son-in-law to his father-in-law, instead Lord Shiva blessed him for Daksha's prosperity; which yet enraged Daksha's ego, so he decided to perform a mahaayagna to which he invited all except the Aadipurusha Lord Shiva himself. In vasthu roopa since Sati was Daksha's favourite child; she couldn't refrain from attending her father's greatest of yajnas. To this, much against Shiva's wishes, Daakshayini went to the yagna uninvited, By then Daksha's favoritism for Sati was perished since she was vaamaangi(left part of the body) of his enemy and he used the situation to insult Mahadeva. Unable to bear the insults - She cursed her father for his ego and showed her nija rupa(as Adishakti); she cursed everybody from Vishnu to Brahma to each individual present over there; Even after many condolences from Vishnu and Brahma, Daakshayini got herself burnt with her own powerful radiance. Hearing this news, Mahaarudra Mahakaala Lord Shiva got very angry and started to perform the RudraTandava dance which created turmoil in the world. In this rage he created Veerabhadra and BhadrakaaLi out of his JaTa (tied hair-matts),  who went to Dakshayagna, disrupted it and beheaded Daksha, after defeating Vishnu, Bhaga, Poosha, Adityas...etc. When Daksha's  wife pleaded mercy, he died and bestowed Daksha with a goat's head. This story is narrated by the dancers performing Veeragase.

Performers
Veeragase is to be performed only by the Jangama also called Maheshwaras - clan of Veerashaiva/Lingayat community. The performers of Veeragase are also called Lingadevaru. The dancers put on a white traditional headgear and a bright red coloured dress. They also adorn themselves with a necklace made of Rudraksha beads, a hip-belt called rudra muke, an ornament resembling a snake and worn around the neck called Nagabharana and anklets. The dancers smear vibhooti on their foreheads, ears and eyebrows. They carry a wooden plaque of Lord Veerabhadra in their left hand and a sword in their right hand.

Female artists do not  traditionally perform this art, but females have started to be a part of stage performance of non-religious nature which merely as a folk dance .

Performance
The dance troop usually consists of two, four or six members. A lead singer in the troupe narrates the story of Daksha yajna as the dance is being performed. A huge decorative pole called Nandikolu which has an orange flag at the top is held by one of the dancers. Traditional percussion instruments called sambal and dimmu lend music to the dance. Cymbals and shehnai and other instruments like karadi and chamala are also used. The dance also involves a ritualistic piercing of a needle across the mouth.

Notes

Karnataka folklore